For Keeps is the third and final album by The Field Mice. It was also their very first (and only) full-length release on Sarah Records - their previous two, Skywriting and Snowball, being mini-albums. "For Keeps" adheres to the Field Mice blueprint of ambient electronica combined with wistful acoustic/jangle pop with Bobby Wratten's lovelorn lyrical obsessions, best represented on the alternately reflective and soaring highlight that is "Star of David".

Despite the middle section of side two being taken up with three successive slow-paced and pastoral-sounding ballads, the album still demonstrates a certain eclecticism that one comes to expect from The Field Mice. Opener "Five Moments", for instance, is a beautifully atmospheric showcase of co-vocalist Anne-Marie Davies' characteristically ethereal vocals. The album's most uptempo [and euphoric] track, "Coach Station Reunion", cheekily steals the guitar riff from The Beatles' "Doctor Robert" via an electric Byrds-ian Rickenbacker guitar, whilst "This Is Not Here" gives the origin of its title away with its blatant Lennon-esque stylings fronted by some psychedelic guitars and phased vocal effects. Two instrumentals bookend the second half: the first, "Tilting at Windmills", shows a more ambient side to the band, whilst the album's rockiest moment; the seven-minute "Freezing Point" which features frazzled Loop-like repetition and caustic guitars at its final coda, brings things to a noisy conclusion.

Track listing
 "Five Moments" – 5:16
 "Star of David" – 5:22
 "Coach Station Reunion" – 3:10
 "This Is Not Here" – 4:58
 "Of the Perfect Kind" – 6:11
 "Tilting at Windmills" – 4:38
 "Think of These Things" – 4:17
 "Willow" – 4:20
 "And Before the First Kiss" – 5:55
 "Freezing Point" – 7:19

2005 bonus tracks 
The following tracks appear on the 2005 reissue of the album from LTM recordings.
 "Missing the Moon"
 "A Wrong Turn and Raindrops"
 "An Earlier Autumn"
 "September's Not So Far Away"
 "Between Hello and Goodbye"

1991 albums
Sarah Records albums
The Field Mice albums